"A Tragedy of Two Ambitions" is a short story by Thomas Hardy and was published in his collection Life's Little Ironies in 1894.
In this story, Hardy tells the story of two brothers who are so ambitious to get out of their social environment that they ignore moral values and willingly accept their father's death and hide all that from their sister.

The story is divided in five chapters and follows the dramatic structure of classical drama.

The story is set in Narrowbourne, which was Hardy's name for West Coker in Somerset.

Summary
The story deals with the two brothers Joshua and Cornelius Halborough and their determination to better their lot in life, Joshua the elder being the driving force as opposed to his more compliant brother. The short story is set in the later part of the 19th century.

Reading the Epistle to the Hebrews in Greek the two boys Joshua and Cornelius are interrupted by their drunken father who used to be a respectable millwright but has become an alcoholic. They are dismayed by their father's behaviour and Joshua guides him to the straw-shed where he starts snoring. Previously their younger sister Rosa has tried to distract them from their studies but they have ignored her.

Joshua Halborough Senior used all the 900 pounds left for his two sons by their mother, who had previously died, for drinking. This left the boys unable to go to Oxford University, as their mother had planned, so they study in a training college for schoolmasters, where they get scholarships. Joshua borrows sufficient money from a local farmer to place his sister Rosa in a finishing school for several years

A few years later Joshua is studying at the theological college where he is supported by his bishop and is going to be presented for ordination. He visits his brother Cornelius, who is a schoolmaster but Joshua is dismissive of this as an occupation and wants Cornelius to become a clergyman too. Joshua muses that he might have aspired to become a bishop had he been able to go to Oxford but is unlikely to achieve this now. Cornelius is easily persuaded that he should also become a clergy man. He tells Joshua that his father has recently called on him asking for money.

Both love their sister Rosa and want to help her have a good life. We are told that their somewhat harsh faces soften when they speak of her to each other. Joshua meets his father with his new wife when they turn up at his theological college. Joshua's father embarrasses him by approaching the sub dean when the worse for drink and Joshua doubts that his father really is married to the woman who accompanies him. Joshua is mortified by this incident and decides to raise enough money to send his father and supposed stepmother away to Canada.

Joshua, who is ordained by now, greatly impresses the congregation at Narrowbourne when he officiates the first time and is asked to dine with the local landowning Fellmer family. During dinner Mrs. Fellmer is surprised by Rosa's sophistication when she dines with them. She muses that had she known how pretty Rosa was she might not have invited her. Albert, Mrs. Fellmer's son, the Squire and a widower, is attracted by Rosa and wants to marry her. Joshua had not anticipated such an outcome to his educating Rosa and is delighted.

Everything seems to be going well for the Halborough family - Cornelius has been ordained and is now Vicar at Narrowbourne Joshua having taken a living elsewhere Then Cornelius comes to tell Joshua that his father has returned to England and is currently in a local gaol after being sentenced for breaking a window while drunk. Fortunately the local newspaper has misspelled his surname. Rosa is not yet formally engaged to the Squire and the brothers fear that their father's inopportune return will ruin everything just when Mrs Fellmer has been brought round to approving the marriage. They decide to go to the town where there father is imprisoned and meet him after he is released from gaol in an attempt to persuade him to go away again. The day before his release date the father has written to Cornelius stating his intention of coming to Narrowbourne to visit his daughter who he has heard will be making an advantageous marriage. He asks his sons to meet him in an inn six miles away. However, when the brothers arrive there their father has already left, reportedly in an intoxicated state.

The brothers hasten back to Narrowbourne and overtake their father who is drunk and quarrelsome. He tricks Joshua into drinking some raw spirits from a flask and taunts Joshua about having been illegitimate, his mother not having been married until after his birth, much to Joshua's mortification. He insists he will attend his daughter's wedding. He walks on ahead and falls into the weir. Cornelius leaps forward to rescue him but Joshua restrains him and both stand by and allow their father to drown. They do not say anything to anyone about what has occurred and wait for months for the body to be discovered. In the meantime, Rosa marries the Squire.

Six months later the body is found but it is unrecognisable. Cornelius can not bear to officiate at the burial service and sends for Joshua to do it instead. Their sister comes to visit and tells them that on the night of her engagement she heard someone calling her name and wonders whether it had anything to do with the unfortunate man who had drowned in the weir. After she leaves Cornelius expresses that he wants to confess everything to her but Joshua talks him out of this. The two brothers do not then see each other for a long while but meet again at the Christening of Rosa's son. Afterwards they are drawn back to the weir where their father drowned. Cornelius muses that he often thinks of suicide and Joshua replies that this thought has come to his mind also.

Characters 

Joshua and Cornelius Halborough:

Joshua and Cornelius are brothers and have a younger sister, Rosa. Their father, Joshua Halborough senior, is a millwright. He was once successful but his business has fallen off because of his increasing unreliability. In  his younger days he had some charm, as he managed to persuade the mother of his children into a relationship with him prior to marriage, as a result of which Joshua was in fact born illegitimate. She was clearly a woman of character, stinting herself to save up enough to send her sons to University, sadly all to no avail because of her death before this could be fulfilled. The brothers bitterly resent the loss of opportunity resulting from their father frittering away this money which means they have to qualify the hard way, by first becoming pupil teachers and then being accepted into theological college. Joshua is the driving force behind the brothers' determination to better themselves; Cornelius is a weaker character who tend to do whatever Joshua tells him. Joshua is extremely focused on bettering his lot and that of his siblings; he puts himself under considerable privations to obtain an education for his sister.

Although Joshua tries to persuade himself and Cornelius that they have a vocation to be clergyman both are using the Church as a vehicle for their own advancement. Although Joshua is an inspiring preacher it is notable that one never once sees him praying for guidance as to how to deal with the perennial problem of his father. In the end, when he allows his father to drown, he is not only motivated by a desire to save Rosa's prospects but also a long festering hatred and resentment of his father who has blighted his prospects and has just taunted the memory of his deceased mother jeering that she was unmarried when he was born. Cornelius, the weaker character, has the right instinct to save his father, but is too long used to obeying his elder brother to resist him and insist on intervening to save his father. It is Cornelius who is the most overcome by remorse although Joshua too appreciates that he has done a grave wrong. We are told that it was to Cornelius rather than Joshua that the millwright wrote when he had anything to communicate so it is possible he had more of a relationship with his father despite his father's shortcomings.

What will become of these two after the end of the novel? Neither will achieve what they had hoped at the outset of the story. Cornelius may well end up committing suicide. Joshua probably will resist any urges of that nature but will end up lonely and embittered, unlikely to marry because of the shameful secret that is on his soul, and not on particularly good terms with his nephews and nieces who will be somewhat frightened of him.

Rosa Halborough:

Rosa Halborough is the younger sister of Joshua and Cornelius. She is able to live a quite happy life because she is protected by her brothers. Her brothers talk about Rosa as an intelligent and beautiful young woman.

Rosa attended a school in Brussels where she received a good education. Joshua makes considerable personal sacrifices to pay for her education, even getting himself into debt. The investment pays off as Rosa makes a very advantageous marriage. At the same time she is clearly a nice girl, not at all calculating, and will be a good stepmother to the widowed Squire's daughter. It is unclear what her relationship with her father was like, there is no suggestion that she feels the bitter antagonism her brother's feel. She would clearly be horrified if she knew of the manner of his death and the role of her brothers in it.

What will Rosa's future be like? Clearly she is in a very happy position, having married the Squire, been accepted by his mother and produced a son and heir. However, lurking in the background is a sense that knowledge of the dark family secrets may come out - she has heard her father's drowning cries, although not realising it was him, and Cornelius feels impelled to tell her the truth. Cornelius probably won't tell her but if he does commit suicide it is to be hoped he can disguise it as an accident. Her relationship with Joshua is unlikely to be good in the future as he becomes more and more reclusive and intimidating - this will be a source of sorrow to her as she will strive to understand the reason for this and not be able to

References

1894 short stories
Works by Thomas Hardy